The Chapina carbine is a bolt-action rifle of Brazilian origin, manufactured between 1964 and 1975 by Empresa Irmãos Chapina S/A in the Itaquaquecetuba municipality; it was primarily intended for civilian users and private security companies. 
The weapon is chambered in the .32-20WCF calibre – the highest legally available to civilians under the Brazilian military government − and is fed from a 5-round detachable box magazine.

References

Carbines
Rifles of Brazil
Bolt-action rifles